The Ministry of Education (Abrv: MOE;) is a Thai governmental body responsible for the oversight of education in Thailand. It was established by King Rama V (Chulalongkorn) in 1892 as the Ministry of Public Instruction  (literally "Ministry of Religious Affairs") which controlled religion, education, healthcare, and museums. In 1941, the ministry changed its Thai name to the present one.

Its headquarters have been in the Chan Kasem Palace since 1937.

Vision
"Quality student-centred education is provided for everyone with distribution of equitable education opportunities, in cities, rural and outreached areas. Education leads to people's vigour building. Vigorous and knowledgeable people are powerful capital to fight poverty."

Departments

Administration
Office of the Minister: Thailand has had 21 education ministers in the past 18 years (2000–2018). Each lasts an average of nine months. As of 2018, the Minister of Education is Teerakiat Jareonsettasin, appointed in 2016.
Office of the Permanent Secretary

Functional departments
Office of the Education Council
Office of the Basic Education Commission
Office of the Vocational Education Commission
Office of the Private Education Commission

Public organizations
Public Organization in Public Organization Act. B.E. 2542
Mahidol Wittayanusorn School
International Institute for Trade and Development
National Institute Educational Testing Service

Public Organization in Specifically Act. 
Institute for the Promotion of Teaching Science and Technology
The Teachers' Council
Office of the Welfare Promotion Commission for Teachers and Education Personnel (Suksapan Store)

References

 
Education
Thailand
Education in Thailand
Thailand, Education
1892 establishments in Siam